Totilawati Tjitrawasita (born Maria Asumta Totilawati Tjitrawasita 1945 – 1982) was an Indonesian journalist and writer. Her pen name was Mbak Minuk.

She was born in Kediri, East Java, June 1, 1945. She was assistant editor for the Japanese language magazine Jaya Baya. In 1970, she won the Zakse award for young journalists. Many of her stories were first published in Japanese. In 1977, she published a collection of short stories Sekolah Rakyat (School Crush); it received first prize for fiction from the Book of the Year Foundation. In 1979, she became an honorary citizen of Surabaya for her contributions to the arts, including membership on the city's arts council. In 1980, she took part in the International Writing Program at the University of Iowa.

References 

1945 births
1982 deaths
Indonesian women short story writers
Indonesian short story writers
Indonesian journalists
People from Kediri (city)
20th-century women writers
International Writing Program alumni
20th-century short story writers
20th-century Indonesian women writers
20th-century Indonesian writers
21st-century Indonesian women writers
21st-century Indonesian writers
20th-century journalists